Peters Lake is a lake in the municipality of Kearney, Parry Sound District in central Ontario, Canada. It is in the Lake Huron drainage basin.

The lake eventually drains via the Magnetawan River system to Georgian Bay on Lake Huron.

References

Lakes of Parry Sound District